
The Assumption Monastery of the Caves (Успенский пещерный монастырь) is located in Crimea, near Bakhchysarai. It is a cave monastery carved out of a cliff.

History 

The date of the monastery's foundation is disputed, although local monks assert that it originated as early as the 8th century but was abandoned when Byzantium lost its hold on the region. The current monastic establishment dates back to the 15th century.

In 1921 the monastery was closed by the Soviet government.  After the dissolution of the Soviet Union and Ukrainian independence the monastery was reopened to the public in 1993.

See also 
 Inkerman Cave Monastery - another cave monastery in Crimea

References

Christianity in Crimea
Christian monasteries in Ukraine
Subterranea (geography)
Tourist attractions in Crimea
Buildings and structures in Crimea
Cave monasteries
Christian monasteries established in the 15th century
Monasteries of the Ukrainian Orthodox Church (Moscow Patriarchate)
Bakhchysarai Raion
Cultural heritage monuments of federal significance in Crimea